Rear Admiral Sir Charles Lionel Vaughan-Lee,  (27 February 1867-16 March 1928) was a senior Royal Navy officer in the early 20th century. He served during World War I, rising to the rank of rear-admiral.

Biography
Vaughan-Lee was born in the English village of Measham in 1867.

Vaughan-Lee was promoted to captain on 30 June 1904.

On 12 August 1915, Vaughan-Lee was promoted to rear-admiral and on 8 September he was selected to be the Director of the Admiralty's Air Department. He continued in this role until the start of 1917 when he was posted to be the Superintendent of Portsmouth Dockyard.

In 1917, he was awarded the Japanese Order of the Rising Sun, Gold and Silver Star, which represents the second highest of eight classes associated with the award.  Notice of the King's permission to accept and to display this honour was duly published in the London Gazette.

He died on 16 March 1928.

References

External links
Probert Encyclopedia – Charles Vaughan Lee

|-
 

1867 births
1928 deaths
Military personnel from Leicestershire
Companions of the Order of the Bath
Knights Commander of the Order of the British Empire
Royal Navy admirals of World War I
Military aviation leaders of World War I
Recipients of the Order of the Rising Sun, 2nd class
Commanders of the Order of Saints Maurice and Lazarus
Commandeurs of the Légion d'honneur
People from Measham
Royal Navy personnel of the Anglo-Egyptian War
People educated at Stubbington House School